Calanthe henryi is a species of plant in the family Orchidaceae. It is endemic to Sichuan and Hubei Provinces of China.

References 

Endemic orchids of China
henryi
Vulnerable plants
Plants described in 1896
Taxonomy articles created by Polbot